Eleutherodactylus cundalli is a species of frog in the family Eleutherodactylidae endemic to Jamaica. Its natural habitats are subtropical or tropical moist lowland forest, rocky areas, and caves.
It is threatened by habitat loss.

References

cundalli
Endemic fauna of Jamaica
Amphibians of Jamaica
Amphibians described in 1926
Taxonomy articles created by Polbot